Arna, commonly styled as ARNA, is an annual literary journal published by the University of Sydney Arts Students Society. Originally named The Arts Journal of the University of Sydney, it was published regularly between 1918 and 1974 under the auspices of the Faculty of Arts and in 1938 the journal was renamed The ARNA: The Journal of the Arts Society. Publishing of the journal ceased unexpectedly in 1974.

After a hiatus of 34 years, publication recommenced in 2008 with the revival of the Sydney Arts Students' Society. Former distinguished editors and contributors include Samuel Beckett, Robert Hughes, Clive James, Lex Banning, Harold Stewart, Geoffrey Lehmann and Les Murray. The editors-in-chief for 2020 are Kate Scott and Jenna Lorge.

Content 
The journal includes predominantly prose fiction, poetry, and visual art. Since 2008, more varied forms have appeared in the journal including radio scripts, photography, and academic essays.

Editorship 
The editors-in-chief of Arna hold dual roles, also performing duties as Publications Officer in the Sydney Arts Students Society and are elected to the role in the Annual General Meeting held at the conclusion of the academic year alongside the other positions on the society's executive. This has attracted controversy in the past as elected editors are chosen in a popular election rather than for experience with the journal.

Past editors 
 2021: Jenna Lorge and Thomas Israel
 2020: Kate Scott and Jenna Lorge
 2019: Nikole Evans and Doris Prodanovic
2018: Alisha Brown and Robin Eames
 2017: Izabella Antoniou and Jack Gibson 
 2016: Eden Caceda and Lamya Rahman
 2015: Whitney Duan and Tahlia Pajaczkowska-Russell
 2014: Nick Fahy and Madeleine Konstantinidis
 2013: Lane Sainty and Alberta McKenzie
 2012: Alex McKinnon and Eleanor Gordon-Smith
 2011: Anne Widjaja and Richard Withers
 2010: Paul Ellis and Julian Larnach
 2009: Callie Henderson and Nancy Lee
 2008: Rebecca Santos and Khym Scott

References

Further reading 
 Barcan, A Student activists at Sydney University 1960-1967 Australian and New Zealand History of Education Society (ANZHES), January 2007. The retired education professor Alan Barcan published his personal view of activism at Sydney University during the 1960s, including references to the student publications Honi Soit, Hermes and Arna

External links 
 

Annual magazines published in Australia
Literary magazines published in Australia
Magazines established in 1918
Magazines published in Sydney
University of Sydney